Vigo is an unincorporated community in Ross County, in the U.S. state of Ohio.

History
A post office called Vigo was in operation from 1858 until 1933. Besides post office, Vigo had a railroad station, hotel, church, brick plant, and several country stores.

References

Unincorporated communities in Ross County, Ohio
Unincorporated communities in Ohio